Michael Holohan (born 27 March 1956) is an Irish composer.

Biography
Michael Holohan was born in Drumcondra, Dublin. He was educated at O'Connell's Schools, University College Dublin (BA, 1978) and Queen's University in Belfast. He studied composition with Jane O'Leary, Eric Sweeney and Seóirse Bodley. He also attended masterclasses by Messiaen, Iannis Xenakis, Pierre Boulez, Luciano Berio, and Helmut Lachenmann in France.

Holohan was chairman of the Association of Irish Composers (AIC), 1987–9, and was later appointed chairman of the Droichead Arts Centre in Drogheda, where he lives since the mid-1980s.

Holohan was elected to Aosdána, an Irish association of artists, in 1999. He is also a member and former Chair of the Toscaireacht 
of Aosdána.

Music
Holohan has composed for solo instrument, ensemble, orchestra, stage, choir and voice. He has also collaborated with a number of poets including Nobel prize-winners Seamus Heaney and Tomas Tranströmer, Ivan Lalic and Paul Durcan.

He has lived in Drogheda since 1983. His compositions have been performed and broadcast both at home and internationally. Career highlights in Drogheda include the performances of Cromwell at the "Drogheda 800" celebrations (RTECO, Lourdes Church, 1994); The Mass of Fire, Augustinian 700 anniversary (RTÉ TV live broadcast, 1995); No Sanctuary with Nobel Laureate and poet Seamus Heaney (Augustinian Church, 1997); Remembrance Sunday Service, at Drogheda Unification 600 (RTE TV live broadcast, St Peter's Church of Ireland) and two major concerts with The Boyne Valley Chamber Orchestra at Fleadh Cheoil na hÉireann in 2018 and 2019.

Selected works

Orchestral
Cromwell (1994)
Leaves of Glass (1995)
Building Bridges (1995)

Ensemble
Triangulum (1977)
Macehead (1992)
A Snail in my Prime (2000) - with text by Paul Durcan

Choir
An Stoirm, Bagairt na Marbh & Sos (1981-4) - with texts by Seán Ó Riordáin
Anahorish & Oracle (1988) - with texts by Seamus Heaney
Mass of Fire (1995)
Quis est Deus? (2001)
In the Empty Hills (2009) - with text by Wang Wei

Voice
Kubla Khan (1974) - awarded RTÉ Young Composer of the Year 1974
Thomas McDonagh (1987) - with text by Francis Ledwidge
The Given Note (1989) - with text by Seamus Heaney
The Potter's Field (1990) - with text by Ivan Lalic

Solo
By a River (1985), for piano
Aoise (1988), for piano
The Road to Lough Swilly (2001), for uilleann pipes
Monaincha (2002), for piano

Stage
Running Beast (2007) - with text by Donal O'Kelly
Where a Single Footprint Lasts a Thousand Years (2009) - with text by Ernest Shackleton and Bill Manhire

Electro-Acoustic
The Source (1990)
July 23rd Dawn (1990)

Select discography
A River of Memories (1999) - co-produced by Breida Delaney
Fields of Blue and White (2010) - pianist, Thérèse Fahy
  The Road to Lough Swilly (2019) - Mick O' Brien, uilleann pipes and The Boyne Valley Chamber Orchestra

References

External links
Michael Holohan at the Contemporary Music Centre
Michael Holohan at Aosdána

1956 births
20th-century classical composers
20th-century male musicians
21st-century classical composers
21st-century male musicians
Irish classical composers
Irish male classical composers
Living people
Musicians from Dublin (city)
People educated at O'Connell School
People from Drumcondra, Dublin